Cum Laude Laurie (May 25, 1974 – March 16, 1982) was an American Thoroughbred racehorse. Bred and raced by the Galbreath family of Darby Dan Farm, she was a daughter of the Champion sire Hail To Reason and the mare Primonetta, the 1962 American Champion Older Female Horse. Her damsire, Swaps was the 1956 American Horse of the Year and a U.S. Racing Hall of Fame inductee.

Trained by Lou Rondinello and ridden by Ángel Cordero Jr., as a three-year-old, Cum Laude Laurie concluded her campaign with four straight stakes races, all of which were Grade 1 events.

She died after surgery for a mesenteric hernia two months before her 8th birthday. At the time of her death, she was in foal to Foolish Pleasure and was due to foal on May 1, 1982.

References
 Cum Laude Laurie's pedigree and partial racing stats

1974 racehorse births
Racehorses bred in Kentucky
Racehorses trained in the United States
Thoroughbred family 16-h